Derevenka is a rural locality (a village) and the administrative center of Nizhneslobodskoye Rural Settlement, Vozhegodsky District, Vologda Oblast, Russia. The population was 226 as of 2002.

Geography 
Derevenka is located 47 km east of Vozhega (the district's administrative centre) by road. Chernovskaya is the nearest rural locality.

References 

Rural localities in Vozhegodsky District